Lenina, known officially as Mariia since 2016, is an urban-type settlement in Luhansk Raion (district) in Luhansk Oblast of eastern Ukraine. Population:

Demographics
Native language distribution as of the Ukrainian Census of 2001:
 Ukrainian: 30.83%
 Russian: 68.72%
 Others 0.46%

References

Urban-type settlements in Luhansk Raion